Comic Book: The Movie is a 2004 direct-to-DVD mockumentary starring, co-written and directed by Mark Hamill.

Plot

Comic book fan Don Swan battles against a fictional film studio that is about to announce a film based on his favorite superhero, Commander Courage.

Cast
 Mark Hamill as Donald Swan
 Billy West as Leo Matuzik
 Donna D'Errico as Liberty Lass, Papaya Smith
 Roger Rose as Taylor Donohue
 Jess Harnell as Ricky
 Lori Alan as Anita Levine
 Daran Norris as Commander Courage, Bruce 
 Jim Cummings as Dr. Cedric Perview
 Jill Talley as Jill Sprang
 Tara Strong as Hotel Maid
 Arleen Sorkin as Ms. Q
 James Arnold Taylor as J.T.
 Debi Derryberry as Debby Newman
 Tom Kenny as Derek Sprang
 Sid Caesar as Old Army Buddy
 Jonathan Winters as Wally (Army Buddy #2)
 Kevin Michael Richardson as Ice Tray

Cameo appearances in the film
 Kevin Smith
 Hugh Hefner
 Stan Lee
 Bruce Campbell
 Peter David
 David Prowse
 Peter Mayhew
 Ron Perlman
 Jeremy Bulloch
 Mike Mignola
 Matt Groening
 Rob Paulsen
 Sergio Aragonés
 Maurice LaMarche
 Bruce Timm

Production
The script was finished on July 29, 2002. Most of the movie was filmed at the 35th annual San Diego Comic-Con international on  August 1-4,2002 All the interviews with attendees while Hamill remained in character were unscripted to obtain a realistic look. This film subverted convention by casting voice actors in live-action roles.  And The comic book the movie panel was on August 2,2002

Release
Comic Book: The Movie was released on DVD on January 27, 2004. Internationally  on September 13,2005  from called NFK Entertainment UK and Australia  then released on DVD again on April 26, 2011.  Started Streaming on  Netflix on Nov 27, 2013-June 2, 2016.

Reception
The film received an approval rating of 40% on review aggregator Rotten Tomatoes, based on five reviews. IGN rated the film a 7 out of 10.

Awards
 DVD Exclusive Awards
 Best Live-Action DVD Premiere Movie
 Best Actor (in a DVD Premiere Movie) - Mark Hamill
 Best Supporting Actor (in a DVD Premiere Movie) - Sid Caesar and Jonathan Winters
 Best Director (in a DVD Premiere Movie) - Mark Hamill

References

External links
Scott Chitwood (20 January 2004) Interview with Mark Hamill by TheForce.Net.
 
 Facebook Tribute Group

2003 direct-to-video films
2003 comedy films
American mockumentary films
Films about comics
Films about fandom
Films about filmmaking
Films directed by Mark Hamill
American comedy films
2000s English-language films
2000s American films